Dykeland is a historic home located near Chula, Amelia County, Virginia. It is a two-story, wood-frame house reflecting two architectural styles and three periods of construction.  It consists of a two-story vernacular section built about 1838 and attached -story rear wing dating to the early-19th century. A two-story Italianate section dates to 1856-1857 and features a hipped roof. A one-story Italianate-style porch unifies the two sections. Also on the property are a contributing smokehouse and shed.

It was added to the National Register of Historic Places in 1987.

References

Houses on the National Register of Historic Places in Virginia
Italianate architecture in Virginia
Houses completed in 1857
Houses in Amelia County, Virginia
National Register of Historic Places in Amelia County, Virginia
1857 establishments in Virginia